The men's C-2 1000 metres event was an open-style, pairs canoeing event conducted as part of the Canoeing at the 1988 Summer Olympics program.

Medalists

Results

Heats
17 teams entered in three heats on September 27. The top four finishers from each of the heats advanced directly to the semifinals and the remaining five teams were relegated to the semifinal.

The Chinese team's intermediate times were not recorded in the official report.

Repechage
A repechage was held on September 27. The top three finishers from the repechage advanced to the semifinal.

Semifinals
Three semifinals took place on September 29. The top three finishers from each semifinal advanced directly to the final.

Final
The final was held on October 1.

References
1988 Summer Olympics official report Volume 2, Part 2. pp. 346–7. 
Sports-reference.com 1988 C-2 1000 m results.

Men's C-2 1000
Men's events at the 1988 Summer Olympics